Mezgitkale is a 2nd- or 3rd-century mausoleum in Mersin Province of Turkey.

Geography 

Mezgitkale (also known as Korkusuz Kral Mezarı “Mausoleum of fearless king” ) is a small mousoleum near Öztürkmenli village in Silifke district. It is accessible from Atakent on the Mediterranean shore.

History 

Although the Turkish suffix -kale means fort, this building is actually a mausoleum. Also, contrary to popular belief it is not a mausoleum of a king. It was built by an eminent Roman citizen (probably a land owner) for his family. The building was used as a tomb for about two centuries. Then it was abandoned during the Byzantine era. During Ottoman era, the building was used as a house and a furnace was added to the original building.

Technical details 

The dimensions of the square building are 7.8 x 7.8 m2 (25.6 x 25.6 ft2).  The entrance with four Corinth type columns and corbels is at the south. On the north wall there are reliefs of a shield, a sword and two scorpions. On the west wall there is a relief (now partially damaged) of a phallus probably dedicated to Priapos. Next to the moselaum, there is a stone carved cistern with dimensions 5 x 20 x 8  m3 ( 16.4 x 65 x 26 ft3).
According to Ministry of Culture and Tourism, there was also an olive oil workshop.

References 

Archaeological sites in Mersin Province, Turkey
Ancient Roman buildings and structures in Turkey
Mausoleums in Turkey
Olba territorium